Hoffer is a surname. Notable people with the surname include:

 Abram Hoffer (1917-2009), Canadian biochemist and psychiatrist 
 Bernard Hoffer (born 1934), Swiss-American composer and conductor
 Bill Hoffer (1870–1959), American baseball player
 Erwin Hoffer (born 1987), Austrian footballer
 Eric Hoffer (1898–1983), American philosopher
 Isaac Hoffer Doutrich (1871–1941), American Republican politician
 Jerick Hoffer (born 1987), American drag queen also known as Jinkx Monsoon
 Leopold Hoffer (1842–1913) Hungarian-English chess player and journalist
 Melissa Hoffer, American lawyer for environmental law
 Paul Höffer, (1895–1949), German composer 
 Peter James Hoffer, (born 1965), Canadian artist 
 Robert Hoffer, American businessman
 Tony Hoffer, American songwriter

See also

 Hofer (disambiguation)
 Höfer
 Hoffa (disambiguation)

German-language surnames

de:Hoffer
es:Hoffer
fr:Hoffer
it:Hoffer
nl:Hoffer
pl:Hoffer
pt:Hoffer
ru:Hoffer